Bernd Redmann (born 10 May 1965 in Bamberg) is a German composer and musicologist.

Career 
Born in Bamberg, Bernd Redmann studied at the Hochschule für Musik und Theater München, music pedagogy and composition with Dieter Acker, and music theory. He was also enrolled for musicology at the Ludwig-Maximilians-Universität München. He continued his studies at the Hochschule für Musik und Darstellende Kunst Mannheim, with Peter Michael Braun, among others. From 1992 he studied musicology at the Mozarteum.

From 1994 Redmann taught at the Musikhochschule München, first accompaniment of Lied, from 1995 also music theory. In 1998/99 he taught at the Mozarteum. From 1999 to 2005 he was Professor for "Tonsatz und Improvisation" at the Hochschule für Musik Köln. In 2005 he was appointed Professor for "Musiktheorie und Gehörbildung" at the Musikhochschule.

Redmann has presided the "Gesellschaft für Musiktheorie" (Association for Music Theory) since 2004.  He has been in the jury of the competition "Bundeswettbewerb Schulpraktisches Klavierspiel Grotrian-Steinweg" at the Hochschule für Musik "Franz Liszt", Weimar.

Works 
Redmann composed solo works such as Geblendete Schatten for piano, Incontro for flute, Metro for viola. His chamber music include Goldrush – Moneyrush, Verstrickung and five little obsessions. He composed works for ensemble, such as Scenario, evocación, and solo concertos, a trumpet concerto, Secret doors for two bassoons and orchestra, and Fliehende Landschaft for viola and ensemble. Orchestral works include Fiasko and 3 Pictures. He composed O and L'usine imaginaire as "Raumkompositionen" (Space compositions) for ensemble.

Fiasko was recorded in 1998, together with the Third Symphony of Anthony Iannaccone and the Symphony 1969 of Theldon Myers. Stephen Ellis reviewed:Fiasko (translated as "total freeing") is a "chain-reaction" of "energy-laden sound materials" that, as the composer has further written, "explode outward. ... The music, freed from any obligation to be orderly, flies out of control." If one comes to the music with this in mind, knowing that the composer has scored "unpredictable music for an unpredictable world," then Fiasko is fun to listen to for its textures and sonic shapes.

In 2003 Redmann composed the music for the film Far out of Oanh Pham. His music-theatre piece Die Gehetzten (The Hurried Ones) was premiered on 19 March 2010 at the Theater Bremen. 

His Migrant for bassoon and string quartet was premiered in Munich on 14 March 2011, played by Lyndon Watts, Clèment Courtin, Namiko Fuse, Konstantin Sellheim and Graham Waterhouse.

Publications 
Redmann wrote the book Methodologie und Theorie der Musikanalyse, and essays and articles on to Beethoven, Schubert, Schenker, Riemann, the musical history of Salzburg, improvisation and instrumentation.

Awards 
Redmanns works received awards such as in 2004 a second prize at the international competition of "The Transparent Factory" of Volkswagen Dresden for L'usine imaginaire.

References

External links 
 

21st-century classical composers
20th-century classical composers
German opera composers
Male opera composers
University of Music and Performing Arts Munich alumni
Mozarteum University Salzburg alumni
Academic staff of the University of Music and Performing Arts Munich
1965 births
Living people
German male classical composers
20th-century German composers
21st-century German composers
20th-century German male musicians
21st-century German male musicians